A Tuba to Cuba is a 2018 American documentary film about the Preservation Hall Jazz Band. The leader of New Orleans' famed Preservation Hall Jazz Band seeks to fulfill his late father's dream of retracing their musical roots to the shores of Cuba in search of the indigenous music that gave birth to New Orleans jazz.  A Tuba to Cuba celebrates the triumph of the human spirit expressed through the universal language of music and challenges us to resolve to build bridges, not wall. The film was directed by T. G. Herrington and Danny Clinch and narrated by Ben Jaffe whose parents founded Preservation Hall in a segregated 1961 New Orleans.  The documentary had its world premiere at the SXSW Film Festival in Austin, TX where Michael King of the Austin Chronicle exclaimed that it is "very likely to become a classic of the music documentary genre."

Production
The film was shot in New Orleans, Havana, Santiago de Cuba, and Cienfuegos.

Accolades

References

External links
 
 
 
 
 
 

2018 documentary films
2018 films
American documentary films
Films set in 2015
Films set in Cuba
Films set in New Orleans
Films shot in Cuba
Films shot in New Orleans
2010s English-language films
2010s American films